There are currently 48 state prisons, geographically grouped into 14 complexes and two correctional treatment facilities, for state prisoners in the U.S. state of Arizona. This number does not include federal prisons, detention centers for the U.S. Immigration and Customs Enforcement, or county jails located in the state.

As of 2007 Arizona had exported more than 2000 prisoners to privately run facilities in Oklahoma and Indiana, a number that would have been higher if not for a riot of Arizona prisoners at the GEO Group's New Castle Correctional Facility on April 27, 2007, protesting the practice.  As of 2013, the states of Vermont, California and Hawaii export prisoners to facilities in Arizona.

State-operated prisons 

 Arizona State Prison Complex – Douglas (capacity 2,148)
 Arizona State Prison Complex – Eyman (capacity 4,549)
 Arizona State Prison Complex – Florence (capacity 3,946)
 Arizona State Prison Complex – Lewis (capacity 4,397)
 Arizona State Prison Complex – Perryville (capacity 2,382)
 Arizona State Prison Complex – Phoenix (capacity 1,042)
 Arizona State Prison Complex – Safford (capacity 1,717)
 Arizona State Prison Complex – Tucson (capacity 4,358)
 Arizona State Prison Complex – Winslow (capacity 1,928)
 Arizona State Prison Complex – Yuma (capacity 2,245)

Privately operated prisons 

 Arizona State Prison – Kingman (operated by GEO Group)(capacity 3,508)
 Arizona State Prison Florence-West (operated by the GEO Group) (capacity 500 male DUI and 250 Criminal Aliens(CA) Minimum Security)
 Arizona State Prison Phoenix-West (operated by the GEO Group) (capacity 500)
 Marana Community Correctional Treatment Facility (operated by Management and Training Corporation) (capacity 500)
 Central Arizona Correctional Facility (operated by the GEO Group) (capacity 1,280)
 Red Rock Correctional Center (operated by the Corrections Corporation of America) (capacity 2,000) Medium Security.

References

External links

 Arizona Department of Corrections

 
Prison
Arizona
Penal system in Arizona